Sigurd Müller (5 May 1924 – 28 May 2011) was a Norwegian chief of police and judge.

He was born in Fredrikstad. During the German occupation of Norway he had to flee the country, enrolling in the Norwegian police troops in Sweden. Joining the regular police force after the war's end, he was stationed in Fredrikstad until 1953. During this time he also graduated from the Police Academy in 1948, and took the cand.jur. degree at the University of Oslo in 1951.

After a period as deputy judge in Sarpsborg, he rose through the police ranks in Haugesund from 1956, Vest-Finnmark from 1957 and Sarpsborg from 1962. Müller then served as police inspector in Oslo from 1963 to 1975, chief of police of Bergen from 1976 to 1982 and chief justice of Moss District Court from 1982 to 1994.

References

1924 births
2011 deaths
People from Fredrikstad
Police officers from Bergen
Norwegian expatriates in Sweden
University of Oslo alumni
Norwegian police chiefs
Norwegian judges